Mehmet Çekiç (born 1 January 1970) is a Turkish Paralympic alpine skier who competes in the LW4 disability class of men's slalom, standing and giant slalom, standing events. He represented his country, Turkey, at the 2014 Sochi and 2018 PyeongChang Paralympics.

Private life
Mehmet Çekiç was born on 1 January 1970. He graduated from the University of Upper Alsace in Colmar, France. He lives in France, where he owns and manages a butchers and grocery shop in Barr, Bas-Rhin, France. He has one son.

In 2009, he was involved in a motorcycle accident, which resulted in his disability after his leg was amputated mid-shinbone, below the knee.

Sports career
Before he became disabled, Çekiç performed weightlifting between 1993 and 1996, and competed at national level in France. He became also a champion.

Alpine skiing was his favorite hobby, even before his accident, due to the proximity of his residence to the mountains. In 2010, he began Para-alpine skiing in France, and debuted internationally for Turkey in the United States in 2013. He is classified as LW4, which is a disability class for Para-skiers with disability in one lower extremity. Çekiç is a member of the ski club in Le Hohwald, Bas-Rhin, France, where he acts also as a skiing instructor. He is coached by French Dany Iselin and Turkish Ersin Beyduz.

Following training in Canada and the United States, after his participation at a competition in Rinn, Tyrol, Austria he qualified to start at the 2014 Winter Paralympics in Sochi, Russia. After a two-week camp in Turkey, he took part at the Paralympics with a teammate. At the 2018 Winter Paralympics in PyeongChang, South Korea, he represented Turkey alone. Çekiç was the flag bearer at the parade of nations of Sochi 2014, and PyeongChang 2018.

References

External links 
 

1970 births
Living people
Turkish male alpine skiers
Paralympic alpine skiers of Turkey
Alpine skiers at the 2014 Winter Paralympics
Alpine skiers at the 2018 Winter Paralympics
Sportsmen with disabilities
Turkish amputees
University of Upper Alsace alumni